Alexander Campbell (1779November 5, 1857) was a National Republican politician from Ohio. He served in the United States Senate.

Born in Frederick County, Virginia, Campbell moved to eastern Tennessee and then to Kentucky with his parents. After studying medicine at Transylvania University, Campbell moved to Ohio in 1803, settling in Adams County a year later. He served in the Ohio House of Representatives from 1807 until 1809-12-12, when he resigned his position to be a U.S. Senator. An early anti-slavery campaigner, he had been unsuccessful in his candidacy for the U.S. Senate in 1808, but won a special election to the state's other seat a few months later and served from 1809 to 1813. He again served in the State House in 1819 and from 1832 to 1833, and in the Ohio State Senate from 1822 to 1824. He ran unsuccessfully for the governorship in 1826.

Ohio Presidential elector in 1820 for James Monroe. Ohio Presidential elector in 1836 for William Henry Harrison.

References

1779 births
1857 deaths
Speakers of the Ohio House of Representatives
Ohio state senators
United States senators from Ohio
People from Adams County, Ohio
American abolitionists
Transylvania University alumni
Ohio Democratic-Republicans
Ohio National Republicans
19th-century American politicians
Democratic-Republican Party United States senators
1820 United States presidential electors
1836 United States presidential electors
Activists from Ohio
Members of the Ohio House of Representatives